Algibacter marinivivus is a Gram-negative bacterium from the genus of Algibacter which has been isolated from the surface of a red alga from the coast of Weihai.

References

Flavobacteria
Bacteria described in 2020